Crystal is the stage name of Colin Munro (born November 1, 1985), a Canadian-British drag performer, TV host and personality best known as a competitor in the first season of RuPaul's Drag Race UK.

Early life
Born in Newfoundland and raised in Nova Scotia, Munro is the stepson of poet Susan Goyette.

Munro attended university for costume design as mentioned in their podcast.

Career
Munro moved to London, England in the late 2000s, initially to work as an aerial performer in the circus, before expanding into drag performance. He initially went by the drag name Crystal Beth, a pun on crystal meth, but changed his drag name to just Crystal before appearing on Drag Race UK on the grounds that he did not want to be perceived as making fun of the serious issue of drug addiction. Munro has also stated that he always wanted to be known as just Crystal, and initially chose the longer name only because when he was new to drag he thought there was a rule that drag queens always had to have two names rather than one. In London's drag scene, Crystal was best known for Mariah and Friendz, a regular drag night inspired by Mariah Carey and, in Crystal's own words, "bringing in touches of delusion, bad fashion and lip-sync malfunctions."

Crystal finished in sixth place on Drag Race UK, being eliminated in the "Girl Group Battle Royale" challenge, after losing a lip-sync to eventual winner The Vivienne.

Following Drag Race UK, Crystal appeared as a special guest in the "Star Sixty-Nine" episode of Canada's Drag Race, playing the caller to a psychic hotline in a minichallenge where the competing queens had to do improv comedy as the psychics. She was subsequently announced as the host of Group Sext, a social distancing-themed LGBTQ dating reality show, for OutTV, and as a drag mentor in the competition series Call Me Mother.

Filmography

Television

References

1985 births
Living people
21st-century Canadian LGBT people
English drag queens
Canadian drag queens
Canadian emigrants to England
Canadian expatriates in England
Entertainers from London
People from Halifax, Nova Scotia
People from Newfoundland (island)
RuPaul's Drag Race UK contestants
Participants in Canadian reality television series